Adelaide (died 1105), was sovereign Countess of Soissons from 1057 until 1105.

She was the daughter of Renaud I, Count of Soissons, and his wife, whose name is unknown, widow of Hilduin III, Count of Montdidier. .

Adelaide became ruler of the County of Soissons upon the death of her father and brother, Guy II, Count of Soissons, in 1057.

Adelaide married William Busac, Count of Eu, grandson of Richard I, Duke of Normandy.  Adelaide and William had five children:
 Renaud II, Count of Soissons
 John I, Count of Soissons, married to Aveline de Pierrefonds
 Manasses of Soissons, Bishop of Cambrai, Bishop of Soissons
 Lithuise de Blois, married to Milo I of Montlhéry
 Unnamed daughter, married to Yves le Vieux.

William Busac became Count of Soissons, de jure uxoris, upon their marriage.

Notes

Sources 

Dormay, C., Histoire de la ville de Soissons et de ses rois, ducs, comtes et gouverneurs, Soissons, 1664 (available on Google Books)

Counts of Soissons
1105 deaths
11th-century women rulers